Bug Sessions is a compilation album of three EPs by indie rock band Saves the Day. The EPs consist primarily of acoustic renditions of the band's songs.

History
The first Bug Sessions volume was announced in February 2006, and was sold on the band's 2006 tour dates with Moneen and Circa Survive as well as on the 2006 Warped Tour.  The EPs were originally intended to be full-band acoustic studio recordings, however the first volume was the only one to follow this format.  The tracks were recorded at the band's studio, The Electric Ladybug.  All songs are played on the acoustic guitar, and some also include drums and bass.

Volumes 2 and 3 of the Bug Sessions were recorded on the band's acoustic tour in fall 2007 with only lead singer/guitarist Chris Conley and then-guitarist David Soloway.  The two volumes were released simultaneously in 2008.  All tracks on the two volumes are acoustic-only.

Only a limited number of all 3 volumes were made available and sold exclusively on the band's tour dates.  In early 2009, the Bug Sessions compilation of all three EPs was released on the iTunes music service.

Track listings

Personnel

Volume 1
 Chris Conley - vocals, guitar
 David Soloway - guitar
 Manuel Carrero - bass
 Pete Parada - drums

Volumes 2 and 3
 Chris Conley - vocals, guitar
 David Soloway - guitar

References

Saves the Day albums